The 1863 United States Senate election in Pennsylvania was held on January 13, 1863. Charles Buckalew was elected by the Pennsylvania General Assembly to the United States Senate.

Results
The Pennsylvania General Assembly, consisting of the House of Representatives and the Senate, convened on January 13, 1863 to elect a Senator to serve the term beginning on March 4, 1863. The results of the vote of both houses combined are as follows:

|-
|-bgcolor="#EEEEEE"
| colspan="3" align="right" | Totals
| align="right" | 133
| align="right" | 100.00%
|}

See also 
 United States Senate elections, 1862 and 1863

References

External links
Pennsylvania Election Statistics: 1682-2006 from the Wilkes University Election Statistics Project

1863
Pennsylvania
United States Senate